Christopher J. Marut is an American diplomat who last served as Director of the American Institute in Taiwan, the de facto embassy of the United States in Taiwan, from 2012 to 2015. He also served as acting consul general of the Consulate General of the United States, Hong Kong and Macau (also a de facto embassy of the United States) from 2009 to 2010. He later served as foreign policy advisor to Commander, United States Pacific Command (CDRUSPACOM), Admiral Harry B. Harris Jr.

Early life and education
Marut was born in Connecticut in 1952; his father, Walter, was an engineer for Pratt & Whitney. Marut received a BBA from the University of Notre Dame in 1974, an MBA from the University of California, Berkeley, and an MA in National Security and Strategic Studies from the Naval War College in Newport, Rhode Island.

Diplomatic career
Marut joined the Foreign Service in 1984; his early postings include the US Embassy in China, the US Consulate General in Hong Kong and Macau, the US Embassy in Malaysia, and a first assignment at the American Institute in Taiwan from 1986 to 1989, where he served as a Consular Officer as well as a Science and Technology Officer. Marut also had stateside postings at the State Department's Bureau of East Asian and Pacific Affairs (EAP), including an appointment as the Director of the Office of Regional and Security Policy.

In 2007, Marut was appointed deputy consul general of the US Consulate General in Hong Kong and Macau; he served as acting consul general from 2009 until a permanent appointment was made in 2010. He returned to the EAP in February 2010 as Director of the Office of Australia, New Zealand and Pacific Island Affairs.

Marut succeeded William Stanton as the Director of the American Institute in Taiwan in September 2012; he completed his three-year term in June 2015. In recognition of his contributions to improved relations between the United States and Taiwan, Marut was awarded the Order of Brilliant Star by President Ma Ying-jeou of Taiwan.

After diplomacy
In July 2015, Marut joined the staff of Commander, United States Pacific Command (CDRUSPACOM), Admiral Harry B. Harris Jr, as a foreign policy advisor.

Family
Marut and wife Loretta have two children, Carolyn and Kenneth, both of whom were born in Taiwan during Marut's first assignment at the American Institute in Taiwan.

References 

|-

1952 births
Living people
People from New Haven, Connecticut
University of Notre Dame alumni
Haas School of Business alumni
American diplomats
Naval War College alumni
Recipients of the Order of Brilliant Star
Directors of the American Institute in Taiwan
Consuls general of the United States in Hong Kong and Macau